Saint-Adrien-d'Irlande is a municipality in the Municipalité régionale de comté des Appalaches in Quebec, Canada. It is part of the Chaudière-Appalaches region and the population is 415 as of 2009.

Until 1982, Saint-Adrien-d'Irlande was known as Ireland-Partie-Nord, to differentiate from the south part, today's Irlande. Then it took the name of the parish, which was named after Pope Adrian III.

References

External links

Commission de toponymie du Québec
Ministère des Affaires municipales, des Régions et de l'Occupation du territoire

Municipalities in Quebec
Incorporated places in Chaudière-Appalaches
Irish diaspora in Quebec